Murtuzaqulu Khan Bayat was the seventh khan of the Maku Khanate in 1895-1923.

References

People from Maku, Iran
Maku Khanate
1866 births
1923 deaths
19th-century monarchs of Persia
20th-century monarchs of Persia